Lamar station is a train station in Lamar, Colorado served by Amtrak. It is served by Amtrak's Southwest Chief line. It was originally built in 1907 by the Atchison, Topeka and Santa Fe Railway.. The current station is designed in a manner similar to that of Garden City station in Kansas, and also serves as the Lamar Visitor's Center. In 2019 it was added to the National Register of Historic Places.

See also 
List of Amtrak stations

References

External links

Lamar Amtrak Station (USA Rail Guide -- TrainWeb)
Colorado Welcome Center at Lamar (Colorado Tourism Office)
Remembrances of D. K. Spencer (Santa Fe Online Historical Society)

Amtrak stations in Colorado
Transportation buildings and structures in Prowers County, Colorado
Atchison, Topeka and Santa Fe Railway stations
Railway stations in the United States opened in 1907
National Register of Historic Places in Prowers County, Colorado